Arnal is both a surname and a given name. Notable people with the name include:

Surname
Ángel Ribera Arnal (1909–2002), Spanish chess master
Albert Arnal (1913–1966), Spanish Valencian pilota
Étienne Arnal (1794–1872), French actor
Maria Arnal (born 1987), Spanish singer
Mariana Arnal (born 1973), Argentine field hockey player
José Cabrero Arnal (1909–1982), Spanish cartoonist
Rubén García Arnal (born 1980), Spanish footballer

Given name
Arnal Llibert Conde Carbó (born 1980), Spanish footballer

Occitan-language surnames